The 221st Street station was a local station on the IRT Broadway–Seventh Avenue Line of the New York City Subway, located at the intersection of Broadway and 221st Street in Inwood, Manhattan. It operated for less than a year.

History 
The West Side Branch of the first subway was extended northward from the line's previous terminus at 157th Street to 221st Street, which served as the line's temporary terminus, on March 12, 1906. This extension was served by shuttle trains operating between 157th Street and 221st Street until May 30, 1906, when express trains began running through to 221st Street.

The station was closed with the extension of service over the new Broadway Bridge to Marble Hill–225th Street on January 14, 1907. After service was discontinued at 221st Street, the structure was dismantled and moved to 230th Street and Broadway for a new temporary terminus.

References 

IRT Broadway–Seventh Avenue Line stations
Broadway (Manhattan)
U.S. Route 9
Railway stations in the United States opened in 1906
1906 establishments in New York City
Railway stations closed in 1907
Defunct Interborough Rapid Transit Company stations
Former elevated and subway stations in Manhattan